The Houston Coal Company Store, also known as the Koppers Store, is an intact example of a coal company store, located at Carswell, West Virginia. The 1923 Italian Renaissance building possesses a detailed brick exterior and a clay tile roof, with skylights at the roof's peak. The store served a small mining community of Carswell, West Virginia, first for the Houston Coal Company and later for the Koppers Coal Company. Another store, now disappeared, served the upper end of the long hollow. The store is surrounded by an expansive lawn, bordered by a stream.

References

Commercial buildings on the National Register of Historic Places in West Virginia
Renaissance Revival architecture in West Virginia
National Register of Historic Places in McDowell County, West Virginia
Commercial buildings completed in 1923
Company stores in the United States